is a Japanese former footballer who played as a goalkeeper. He started his career with Kashiwa Reysol and played the majority of his career for the club, before spending two years on loan at FC Gifu. He retired in January 2023 after a 16 year professional career and took up a coaching role with Criacao Shinjuku.

National team career
In July 2007, Kirihata was called up to the Japan U-20 national team for the 2007 U-20 World Cup but did not play in any of the matches.

Club statistics

1Includes Japanese Super Cup, Suruga Bank Championship and FIFA Club World Cup.

References

External links

Profile at Kashiwa Reysol

1987 births
Living people
Association football people from Yamanashi Prefecture
Japanese footballers
Japan youth international footballers
J1 League players
J2 League players
J3 League players
Kashiwa Reysol players
FC Gifu players
Association football goalkeepers